The 2018 FIL Junior European Luge Championships took place under the auspices of the International Luge Federation at Winterberg, Germany from 20 to 21 January 2018.

Schedule
Four events were held.

Medalists

Medal table

References

FIL Junior European Luge Championships
FIL Junior European Luge Championships
FIL Junior European Luge Championships
International luge competitions hosted by Germany